In enzymology, a glycoprotein-fucosylgalactoside alpha-N-acetylgalactosaminyltransferase is an enzyme that catalyzes the chemical reaction

UDP-N-acetyl-D-galactosamine + glycoprotein-alpha-L-fucosyl-(1,2)-D-galactose  UDP + glycoprotein-N-acetyl-alpha-D-galactosaminyl-(1,3)-[alpha-L-fucosyl- (1,2)]-D-galactose

Thus, the two substrates of this enzyme are UDP-N-acetyl-D-galactosamine and glycoprotein-alpha-L-fucosyl-(1,2)-D-galactose, whereas its 3 products are UDP, [[glycoprotein-N-acetyl-alpha-D-galactosaminyl-(1,3)-[alpha-L-fucosyl-]], and [[(1,2)]-D-galactose]].

This enzyme belongs to the family of transferases, specifically those glycosyltransferases hexosyltransferases.  The systematic name of this enzyme class is UDP-N-acetyl-D-galactosamine:glycoprotein-alpha-L-fucosyl-(1,2)-D-ga lactose 3-N-acetyl-D-galactosaminyltransferase. Other names in common use include A-transferase, histo-blood group A glycosyltransferase, (Fucalpha1→2Galalpha1→3-N-acetylgalactosaminyltransferase), UDP-GalNAc:Fucalpha1→2Galalpha1→3-N-acetylgalactosaminyltransferase, alpha-3-N-acetylgalactosaminyltransferase, blood-group substance alpha-acetyltransferase, blood-group substance A-dependent acetylgalactosaminyltransferase, fucosylgalactose acetylgalactosaminyltransferase, histo-blood group A acetylgalactosaminyltransferase, histo-blood group A transferase, UDP-N-acetyl-D-galactosamine:alpha-L-fucosyl-1,2-D-galactose, and 3-N-acetyl-D-galactosaminyltransferase.  This enzyme participates in 3 metabolic pathways: the lactoseries and neolactoseries of glycosphingolipid biosynthesis, as well as the biosynthesis of glycan structures.

Structural studies

References

 
 
 

EC 2.4.1
Enzymes of known structure